Percy L. Greaves Jr. (August 24, 1906 – August 13, 1984) was an American free-market economist, historian, and presidential candidate.

Biography
Greaves was born in Brooklyn, New York, on August 24, 1906. He received a B.S. in business administration, magna cum laude, from Syracuse University in 1929. He then enrolled in graduate courses in economics at Columbia University and New York University. Greaves became the financial editor and research economist for the United States News from 1934 to 1936. He resigned to take an executive job in Paris; he traveled widely in Europe until he returned to the US in 1938. Back in the States, he took a job directing research and survey activities for the Metropolitan Life Insurance Company and did extensive political research.

From 1943 to 1945, Greaves was Research Director for the Republican National Committee. Greaves later served as Chief of Minority Staff for the 1945–1946 "Joint Congressional Investigation of the Pearl Harbor Attack".

He authored several books on economics, including Understanding the Dollar Crisis (1973) and Mises Made Easier (1974). Greaves was a longtime associate and friend of Ludwig von Mises, regularly attending his seminars. Greaves and his wife attended Mises' graduate seminar at the New York University Graduate School of Business Administration each year from 1950 to 1969. He was also a seminar speaker for the Foundation for Economic Education. Greaves served on the Institute for Historical Review (IHR) Editorial Advisory Committee and frequently wrote for IHR's Journal of Historical Review, generally about Pearl Harbor revisionism.

In the 1974 elections, Greaves was an unsuccessful US Senate candidate in New York for the Free Libertarian Party. Murray Rothbard had commented the same year that Greaves "believes in taxation, and ... favors the draft."

Greaves was nominated as the 1980 presidential candidate for the American Party, with Frank L. Varnum as his running mate. They received 6,648 votes. The state parties of Kansas and Minnesota were unhappy with Greaves's moderate stance on abortion and put anti-Greaves tickets on their ballot lines, winning 1,555 and 6,136 votes respectively. Greaves had also sought the nomination of the American Independent Party but was defeated.

Greaves died due to cancer in 1984. He was survived by his wife, three children, and seven grandchildren.

In 2010, Percy’s wife completed an unfinished manuscript left behind after his death and it was published posthumously by the Ludwig von Mises Institute as Pearl Harbor: The Seeds and Fruits of Infamy.

Publications
Articles
 "Does Government Spending Bring Prosperity?" The Freeman (February 1955).

Books
 Understanding the Dollar Crisis. Belmont, Mass.: Western Islands (1973). Foreword by Ludwig von Mises.
 Pearl Harbor: The Seeds and Fruits of Infamy. Auburn, Ala.: Ludwig von Mises Institute (2010). Edited by Bettina B. Greaves.
 On the Manipulation of Money and Credit: Three Treatises on Trade-Cycle Theory. Indianapolis: Liberty Fund (2011). Translated, with a foreword, by Bettina Bien Greaves.

Book contributions
 "The Pearl Harbor Investigations" (Chapter 7). In: Perpetual War for Perpetual Peace, by Harry Elmer Barnes. Caldwell, Ida.: Caxton Printers (1953). .
 "Is Further Intervention a Cure for Prior Intervention?" (Chapter 9). In: On Freedom and Free Enterprise: Essays in Honor of Ludwig von Mises. Edited by Mary Sennholz. New York: D. Van Nostrand (1956), pp. 285–307..

See also
 American Party (1969)
 Austrian School

References

1906 births
1984 deaths
20th-century American historians
20th-century far-right politicians in the United States
American male non-fiction writers
20th-century American politicians
Economists from New York (state)
American Independent Party politicians
American Party (1969) politicians
Historical negationism
New York (state) Libertarians
New York (state) Republicans
Old Right (United States)
People from Brooklyn
Candidates in the 1980 United States presidential election
20th-century American economists
Syracuse University alumni
Historians from New York (state)
20th-century American male writers